The Australian women's cricket team toured England 
8 July – 29 August 1987 to contest The Women's Ashes for the tenth time. Australia won the three match Test series 1–0 to retain the Ashes.

Prior to the Test series, a three match WODI series was drawn at one match each. Australia also played 15 tour matches – winning 8, losing none, drawing 3, 1 match was abandoned and for 3 of the matches, the result is unknown.

In the lead up to this tour, Australia toured Ireland and won all three WODI matches.

Tour matches

55-over match: Middlesex Women vs Australia Women

1-day single innings match: Surrey Women vs Australia Women

55-over match: South Women vs Australia Women

1-day single innings match: South Women vs Australia Women

55-over match: Women's Cricket Association President's XI vs Australia Women

55-over match: South East Women vs Australia Women

Kent Women vs Australia Women

1-day single innings match: East Anglia and Thames Valley Women vs Australia Women

55-over match: East Midlands Women vs Australia Women

55-over match: West and West Midlands Women vs Australia Women

55-over match: West and West Midlands Women vs Australia Women

55-over match: North Women vs Australia Women

North Women vs Australia Women

55-over match: Yorkshire Women vs Australia Women

Young England Women vs Australia Women

WODI series

1st WODI

2nd WODI

3rd WODI

Test series

1st Test

2nd Test

3rd Test

References

International cricket competitions from 1985–86 to 1988
1987 in women's cricket
1987 in Australian cricket
1987 in English cricket
England 1987
Australia 1987
cricket
cricket